Kristian Matte (born September 3, 1985) is a professional Canadian football offensive linemen for the Montreal Alouettes of the Canadian Football League (CFL). He was drafted seventh overall by the Alouettes in the 2010 CFL Draft and signed with the team after attending mini camp with the NFL's Houston Texans. He played CIS football for the Concordia Stingers.

Professional career

Houston Texans
Matte signed with the NFL's Houston Texans on April 24, 2010, which was approximately one week before the CFL draft. Nonetheless, the Montreal Alouettes selected him with their seventh overall pick. Their gamble paid off as Matte was released by the Texans on June 16, 2010.

Montreal Alouettes
On July 14, 2010, it was announced that Matte had signed a contract with the Montreal Alouettes. He signed an extension with the team on December 18, 2020.

Acting Career 
In October 2003 Matte played Jason Voorhees in the viral internet short film comedy "Horror Friends" written and directed by his high school friend and former band mate, Jordan Crowder. Matte also had a brief cameo in Crowder's independent feature film "Bend & Break" billed as "Pool Hall Thug."

Music career 
Kristian Matte was the drummer of the Canadian Punk Band "Cadywoompus" in the early 2000's.

References

External links
Montreal Alouettes bio 

1985 births
Canadian football offensive linemen
Concordia Stingers football players
Living people
Montreal Alouettes players
Players of Canadian football from Nova Scotia
Sportspeople from Halifax, Nova Scotia
American football offensive linemen
Canadian players of American football
Houston Texans players
Players of Canadian football from Quebec